Emoia aneityumensis, Medway's emo skink or the Anatom emo skink, is a species of lizard in the family Scincidae. It is found in Vanuatu.

References

Emoia
Reptiles described in 1974